Convention Center station is an at-grade light rail station on the Blue Line and the Green Line of the VTA light rail system. The station platform is located in the median of West San Carlos Street, between Almaden Boulevard and Market Street. The station is located across from the San Jose Convention Center, after which the station is named.

Convention Center was renovated in 2006 to be made fully wheelchair accessible.

Service

Station layout

Notable places nearby 
The station is within walking distance of the following notable places:
Opera San José at the California Theatre – 2 blocks away – 345 1st Street
San Jose Convention Center – across the street – 150 West San Carlos Street
San Jose Civic (auditorium) – across the street – 135 West San Carlos Street
San Jose Center for the Performing Arts – 1 block away – 255 Almaden Boulevard
The Tech Interactive – 3 blocks away – 201 South Market Street

References

External links 

Santa Clara Valley Transportation Authority light rail stations
Santa Clara Valley Transportation Authority bus stations
Railway stations in San Jose, California
Railway stations in the United States opened in 1987
1987 establishments in California